Agelasta columba is a species of beetle in the family Cerambycidae. It was described by Francis Polkinghorne Pascoe in 1859. It is known from Sri Lanka.

References

columba
Beetles described in 1859
Insects of Sri Lanka
Beetles of Asia
Taxa named by Francis Polkinghorne Pascoe